Koratkar is an Indian surname belonging to Deshastha Brahmin community.

 Keshav Rao Koratkar, was a pioneer of political, social and educational reforms in Hyderabad State, India. 
 Nikhil Koratkar is an Endowed Chair Professor of Mechanical Engineering and Materials Science at Rensselaer Polytechnic Institute.
 Vinayak Rao Koratkar, was a political leader in Hyderabad State and Member of 2nd Lok Sabha.